Brackenbury is a surname. Notable people with the surname include:

Charles Booth Brackenbury (1831-1890), British major general and military correspondent (nephew of Edward Brackenbury)
Curt Brackenbury (born 1952), Canadian ice hockey player
Edward Brackenbury (1785–1864), British soldier
Georgina Brackenbury (1865–1949), British painter and suffragette (daughter of Charles Booth Brackenbury)
Hannah Brackenbury (1795–1873), British philanthropist, benefactress of Balliol College, Oxford
Henry Brackenbury (1837–1914), British soldier (brother of Charles Booth Brackenbury)
Henry Langton Brackenbury (1868–1920), British politician
Joseph Brackenbury, poet
Marie Brackenbury (1866-1950), British painter and suffragette (daughter of Charles Booth Brackenbury)
Robert Brackenbury (died 1485), English courtier and soldier
Sammy Thurman Brackenbury (born 1933), hall of fame barrel racer

See also
Brackenbury Village, a residential district of west London.
Lord Brackenbury, a novel by Amelia Edwards
The Brackenbury Scholarship to Balliol College, Oxford